The Canadian province of Manitoba first required its residents to register their motor vehicles and display licence plates in 1911. , plates are issued by Manitoba Public Insurance. Front and rear plates are required for most classes of vehicles, while only rear plates are required for motorcycles and trailers.

Passenger baseplates

1911 to 1947
The first Manitoba licence plate that complied with these standards was issued 25 years beforehand, in 1931.

No slogans were used on passenger plates during the period covered by this subsection.

1948 to present
Manitoba is currently one of five provinces where decals are not used to show that the vehicle has valid registration, the others being Alberta, British Columbia, Saskatchewan and Quebec.

Specialty plates

Non-passenger plates

Vanity plates
The province also offers personalized vanity license plates, at a cost of $100. These plates can be affixed to passenger vehicles, non-commercial trucks, farm trucks, motorcycles, mopeds and motorhomes.

References

External links

Manitoba licence plates, 1969–present

1911 establishments in Manitoba
Manitoba
Transport in Manitoba
Manitoba-related lists